Kitui Rural Constituency is an electoral constituency in Kenya. It is one of eight constituencies in Kitui County. The constituency was established and gazetted in 2012 by the IEBC in readiness for the 2013 elections.

Members of Parliament

Wards

See also
Kitui West Constituency
Kitui South Constituency
Kitui Central Constituency
Kitui East Constituency
Mwingi North Constituency
Mwingi Central Constituency
Mwingi West Constituency

References

Constituencies in Kitui County
Constituencies in Eastern Province (Kenya)
2013 establishments in Kenya
Constituencies established in 2013